Holiday Park is a neighbourhood in south-central Saskatoon, Saskatchewan. Located within Saskatoon's Ward 2, Councillor Hilary Gough represents the area's interests at City Hall.

Holiday Park has an official neighbourhood association which sets out leisure activities, and provides community members a forum to discuss community issues such as neighbourhood watch, block parent programs, etc. This neighbourhood is surrounded by a plethora of amenities.  To the south is Holiday Park golf course, commanding a championship 18-hole and executive 9-hole course.  It is used year-round, providing snow golf and well-groomed cross country ski trails in the winter months.  To the north is the Riversdale Tennis Club and Riversdale pool, an outdoor swimming pool with water slide features.  To the west is the Gordie Howe Management Area with Gordie Howe Bowl, Baseball Diamonds, Speed Skating Oval.  Along the east the Meewasin Valley Authority provides walking and biking trails  along the South Saskatchewan River.  Canoeists, water skiers, and kayakers have a wonderful time enjoying the convenience of the Saskatchewan River.  Holiday Park's population is 1,400.

History
The Holiday Park community was planned out on maps as early as 1911, and development was soon under way. The Saskatoon Tuberculosis Sanitorium was opened April 15, 1925
 and was a landmark of the community, widely visible from the opposite side of the river. After the Sanatorium closed, it was used for various purposes before the building was demolished in the 1990s; its grounds remain in use as a park.

June 27, 1962 was the official opening of the Holiday Park Golf Course.

The Bowerman House was a hunting lodge constructed by Allen Bowerman, and later used as physician housing for The Saskatoon Sanatorium

Government and politics
Holiday Park exists within the federal electoral district of Saskatoon West. It is currently represented by Brad Redekopp of the Conservative Party of Canada, first elected in the 2019 Canadian federal election.

Provincially, the area is within the constituency of Saskatoon Riversdale. It is currently represented by Marv Friesen of the Saskatchewan Party, first elected in the 2020 Saskatchewan general election

In Saskatoon's non-partisan municipal politics, Holiday Park lies within Ward 2. It is currently represented by Hilary Gough, first elected in 2016 and re-elected in 2020.

Education

Saskatoon French School / l'École Française de Saskatoon - elementary, associate school with Greater Saskatoon Catholic Schools
St. John Community School - separate (Catholic) elementary, part of Greater Saskatoon Catholic Schools

Area Parks
Boughton Park  
Holiday Park  
Victoria Park

Transportation

City Transit
Holiday Park is serviced by Saskatoon Transit bus route #9.

Layout
The northern boundary extends no further than 11th Street, and the southern edge overlooks the scenic vista of the Holiday Park Golf Course. Avenue P South through to the South Saskatchewan River are the western and eastern boundaries respectively. The roads are laid out in a grid fashion, the streets south of 11th Street are named: Dudley, Schuyler, and Wellington Streets, followed by Embassy Drive. The avenues are labelled alphabetically with the alphabet. Spadina Crescent cruises along the South Saskatchewan River and incrementing westward through the alphabet. A key three-way intersection at 11th Street, Avenue H and Spadina Crescent was closed for several years in the mid-2010s to allow for expansion of a water treatment plant, forcing southbound motorists to cut-through Holiday Park in order to access and egress Spadina Crescent. In 2016 the intersection was reopened, but was permanently closed in March of 2019.

Spadina Crescent was for many years the primary access road to the city's main landfill and the Queen Elizabeth II Power Station. With Spadina Crescent closed, landfill traffic and power plant traffic is now rerouted via a new entrance to the dump off Valley Road to the southwest of Holiday Park.

Shopping

There is local shopping available at the convenience stores located at Avenue L South and 11th Street such as Victoria Fine Foods, as well the 11th Street arterial district which begins at Avenue P South.

References

External links
Local Area Planning
Saskatoon Neighbourhoods Word Search Puzzle
City of Saskatoon City of Saskatoon · Departments · Community Services · City Planning · ZAM Maps
City of Saskatoon · Departments · Community Services · Community
Populace Spring 2006

Neighbourhoods in Saskatoon